Rope-A-Dope is an album trumpeter Lester Bowie recorded for the Muse label and released in 1976. It features performances by Bowie, Joseph Bowie, Malachi Favors Maghostut, Don Moye, Charles Bobo Shaw and Raymund Cheng.

Reception
In his review for Allmusic, Scott Yanow awarded the album 4 stars, stating: "Throughout, the highly expressive Lester Bowie is heard in prime form".

Track listing
 All compositions by Lester Bowie except where indicated
 Recorded at Blue Rock Studios, New York City, 17 June 1975

 "Tender Openings" 9:29
 "St. Louis Blues (Chicago Style)" 9:36 (Handy)
 "Mirage" 6:40
 "Rope-a-Dope" 9:30

Personnel
 Lester Bowie: trumpet
 Joseph Bowie: trombone (tracks 2 & 4), percussion (track 1)
 Malachi Favors Maghostut: bass
 Don Moye: drums (tracks 1, 2, & 3), congas (track 4)
 Charles Bobo Shaw: drums (tracks 1, 2 & 4)
 Raymund Cheng: violin (track 1)

References

1976 albums
Muse Records albums
Lester Bowie albums
Albums produced by Michael Cuscuna